The title Fianṡruth (Find) refers to two alphabetically arranged Middle Irish lists of names associated with the Finn Cycle, preserved only in the Yellow Book of Lecan and probably datable to the twelfth century. The lists A and B are preceded by almost identical introductions. Many of the approximately 170 names do not occur elsewhere in the attested sources, while a number of familiar faces from later tales in the Finn Cycle, such as Fergus finnbél, are missing.

Manuscript sources
List A: YBL (p. 119a ff), headed “It e annso anmann muntire Find .i. fiandsroth fian Find u(i) Baiscne”
List B: YBL (p. 325a), headed “Fianruth Fiand inso”

Title
The title fian-ṡruth literally means ‘fian-stream’, which one may render as ‘fían-lore’. As observed by Stern, the word recurs in the Metrical Dindshenchas of Carmun as one of the literary genres to be recited at the Fair of Carmun:

Introduction from List B
Except in facsimile, the actual name-lists have not yet seen publication. Ludwig Stern's edition and German translation of the introduction are as follows (deviations in List A are indicated where necessary):

Notes

Sources
Atkinson, Robert. Yellow Book of Lecan. Dublin, 1896. Facsimile edition, pp. 119, 325.
Gwynn, Edward (ed. and tr.). The Metrical Dindshenchas. Vol. 3. Dublin: DIAS, 1906. Available online from CELT.
Meyer, Kuno (intro, ed. and tr.). Fíanaigecht, being a Collection of Hitherto Unedited Irish Poems and Tales Relating to Finn and his Fiana, with an English Translation. Todd Lecture Series 16. Dublin: Dublin Institute for Advanced Studies, 1910.
Stern, Ludwig Christian. “Fiannshruth.” Zeitschrift für celtische Philologie 1 (1897): 471–3.

Fenian Cycle
Early Irish literature
Irish language
Irish-language literature
Irish texts
Medieval literature